Chromodoris annae is a species of sea slug, a very colourful nudibranch, a shell-less marine gastropod mollusc in the family Chromodorididae.

Distribution
This species of nudibranch is found in the central area of the Indo-Pacific region from Malaysia, Indonesia and the Philippines to the Marshall Islands.

Description
Chromodoris annae can reach a maximum size of 5 cm length. 
The body is elongate with a foot which is distinct from the upper body by a skirt like mantle hiding partially the foot.
The branched gills and the rhinophores are orange to yellow.
The main background color is bluish, the intensity of the latter varying from blue-grey to intense blue, slightly speckled by tiny black spots.
The blue dorsal side and the foot are bordered with a black line which can be discontinuous depending on the specimen. A black dash between the rhinophores distinguishes this species from similar species like Chromodoris elisabethina and Chromodoris westraliensis.
The mantle edge and the foot are bordered with white and orange to yellow lines in which the width and the color intensity can vary greatly from a specimen to another.

Ecology

This nudibranch feeds on the sponge Petrosaspongia sp.

References

External links
 

Chromodorididae
Gastropods described in 1877